Album II is the second album by Loudon Wainwright III. It was released in 1971 by Atlantic Records.

Track listing

Personnel
Loudon Wainwright III - guitar, vocals
Kate McGarrigle - vocals on "Old Paint"
Saul Broudy - harmonica on "Old Paint"
Technical
Milton Kramer - producer on tracks 1, 9 and 5c. All other tracks produced by Loudon Wainwright III
Michael Leary - engineer
Peter Hujar - cover photography
Milton Kramer, Andrew Wainwright - photography

Release history
LP: Atlantic SD 8291 (U.S.)
LP: Atlantic K40272 (UK)
LP: Atlantic 2400 142 (UK)
LP: Edsel ED310 (1989 re-release)
CD: Collector's Choice 633 (April 25, 2006 re-release)

References

Loudon Wainwright III albums
1971 albums
Atlantic Records albums
Collectors' Choice Music albums
Albums produced by Loudon Wainwright III